The Mittivakkat Glacier is located in southeast Greenland, and is part of the largest ice field on Ammassalik Island. This glacier has been in retreat (negative net mass balance) throughout most of recorded history (1898–2008).

Reindeer bones were recovered from the retreating glacier in 2005, and dated to about 1200-1300 AD.

References

External links
 
 

Glaciers of Greenland